The India cricket team toured the West Indies and the United States during August and September 2019 to play two Tests, three One Day Internationals (ODIs) and three Twenty20 International (T20I) matches. The tour started with two of the T20I matches played at the Central Broward Regional Park in Lauderhill, Florida. The Test series formed part of the inaugural 2019–2021 ICC World Test Championship. The fixtures were confirmed in June 2019.

In February 2019, Chris Gayle announced his retirement from ODI cricket, and he last played in a Test match in September 2014, against Bangladesh. However, in June 2019, during the Cricket World Cup, Gayle expressed his desire to play in the ODI matches for the West Indies, and possibly a Test match as well. In July 2019, Cricket West Indies named the ODI squad for the series, with Gayle included in the team. India's MS Dhoni elected to miss the tour to serve with his army regiment, and Hardik Pandya was rested for the series.

India won the T20I series 3–0. In the second ODI, Chris Gayle became the first West Indian cricketer to play in 300 ODI matches. It was his 297th ODI for the West Indies, with Gayle also playing three ODIs for the ICC World XI team. In the same match, Gayle also became the leading run-scorer for a West Indies batsman in ODI cricket. He went past Brian Lara's record of 10,348 runs. India won the ODI series 2–0, after the first match finished as a no result.

India won the Test series 2–0. The second match was Virat Kohli's 28th win as captain of India, becoming the most successful captain of India in Test cricket.

Squads

Ahead of the tour, Andre Russell ruled himself out of the West Indies' T20I squad and was replaced by Jason Mohammed. Fabian Allen was added to the West Indies' squad for the third T20I match, replacing Khary Pierre. Keemo Paul was ruled out of the first Test for the West Indies, with Miguel Cummins named as his replacement. For the second Test, Keemo Paul recovered from his injury, returning to the West Indies' squad, replacing Cummins. Jahmar Hamilton was added to the West Indies' squad for the second Test, replacing Shane Dowrich, who had an ankle injury.

In the second innings of the second Test, Jermaine Blackwood replaced Darren Bravo as a concussion substitute in the West Indies' squad.

Tour match

Three-day match: West Indies A vs India

T20I series

1st T20I

2nd T20I

3rd T20I

ODI series

1st ODI

2nd ODI

3rd ODI

Test series

1st Test

2nd Test

Notes

References

External links
 Series home at ESPN Cricinfo

2019 in West Indian cricket
2019 in Indian cricket
International cricket competitions in 2019
Indian cricket tours of the West Indies